San Carlos is a town and municipality in the Colombian department of Antioquia, part of the subregion of Eastern Antioquia. It is called the hydro-electrical capital of Colombia, because it has many dams and it produces much energy.

History
The site of the town was discovered by Captain Francisco Nuñez Pedroso. The town was founded on 14 August 1786.

Geography
The municipal area is 702 km². It has three corregimientos, El Jordán, Puerto Garzas and Samaná del Norte.

San Carlos is three hours away from the departmental capital, Medellín. The two are linked by a road.

Economy
Tourism - one of the more important economic enterprises for the municipality
Energy production with dams
Wood exploitation

Sites of interest
Dams such as the Punchiná Dam
Waterfalls - an ecological path about 20 minutes from the central park has two beautiful waterfalls, the river making natural pools
Landscape
Fishing

References

Municipalities of Antioquia Department